The 2012–13 SpVgg Greuther Fürth season is the 110th season in the club's football history. In 2012–13 the club plays in the Bundesliga, the top tier of German football. It is the clubs first-ever season in this league, having been promoted from the 2. Bundesliga in 2012.

The club also took part in the 2012–13 edition of the DFB-Pokal, the German Cup, where it was knocked out in the first round by third division side Kickers Offenbach.

Review and events
For the club's second home game in the Bundesliga, against Schalke 04, former United States Secretary of State Henry Kissinger announced his attendance, having been a lifelong fan of the club. Felix Klaus put his name down in the history books, as his goal against Mainz 05 in their second game earned Greuther Fürth their first ever win in the Bundesliga.

Matches

Legend

Friendly matches

Bundesliga

DFB-Pokal

Squad

Squad and statistics

Transfers

In

Out

Sources

External links
 2012–13 SpVgg Greuther Fürth season at Weltfussball.de 
 2012–13 SpVgg Greuther Fürth season at kicker.de 
 2012–13 SpVgg Greuther Fürth season at Fussballdaten.de 
 2012–13 Season Stats at ESPN

Greuther Furth
SpVgg Greuther Fürth seasons